Jyväskylä RC is a Finnish rugby club in Jyväskylä.

History
The club was founded in 2001. Ladies team since 2005.

References

External links
Jyväskylä RC

Finnish rugby union teams
Rugby clubs established in 2001
Sport in Jyväskylä